The list of lakes in Japan ranked by surface area.

1) For lakes in the Hokkaidō region, Subprefecture is listed

See also

List of lakes by area
List of lakes by depth
List of lakes by volume

References
  The Japanese Ministry of Land, Infrastructure, and Transport - Significant Lakes of Japan
  Wikipedia - List of lakes in Japan

Japan

Lakes